Bhimaneni Srinivasa Rao is an Indian film director, producer, actor and writer from Andhra Pradesh. He is also known as a remake specialist. He had several hit films to his credit including Subhamastu, Subhakankshalu, Suswagatam and Suryavamsam. He had also turned a tasteful producer by making Nee Thodu Kavali. He made his acting debut with Kudirithe Cup Coffee.

Early life and career
Bhimaneni Srinivasa Rao was born at Tathapudi village in a  farmer's family at Guntur District. He did his schooling at Tathapudi, Murikipudi and Martur villages. Later he did his college education in Chilakaluripet.
He started his career working as an assistant director under T.Krishna for Vande Mataram, Devalayam, Repati Pourulu films.

Filmography

As director

As producer

As actor

References

External links
 
 

Telugu film directors
Telugu film producers
Telugu screenwriters
Living people
Screenwriters from Andhra Pradesh
Film directors from Andhra Pradesh
People from Guntur district
Film producers from Andhra Pradesh
20th-century Indian film directors
21st-century Indian film directors
Year of birth missing (living people)